Michi Itami (born 1938) is a Japanese-American visual artist.  Her work includes printmaking, painting, ceramics and digital art and has been exhibited internationally. She has had solo exhibitions at A.I.R. Gallery, New York; 2221 Gallery in New Delhi, India; Shinsegae Gallery in Seoul, Korea; Beni Gallery in Kyoto, Japan, among others. In 2004 Itami was awarded a Lifetime Achievement Award from the Woman's Caucus on Art. She taught at the San Francisco Art Institute and at California State University, Hayward, and is Professor Emerita at City University of New York where she taught for over 20 years. Itami received a BA in English Literature from UCLA in 1959; later studied at Columbia University in New York where she performed graduate work from 1959 to 1962 in Japanese and English literature, later receiving a MA degree in 1971 from the University of California Berkeley. She was a member of Godzilla, an Asian American arts advocacy group.

Early life
Itami and her family were incarcerated at the Manzanar War Relocation Center during World War II following the signing of Executive Order 9066. Her father, Akira Itami, was the model for a character in  Toyoko Yamasaki's 1983 novel titled "Futatsu no Sokoku", Two Motherlands.

Awards, honors
Itami has received a National Endowment for the Arts grant in printmaking, a New York Foundation for the Arts Grant, and a Printmaking Fellowship in Asilah, Morocco.

Collections
Itami's work is included in those at the Brooklyn Museum, San Francisco Legion of Honor Museum, National Museum of Modern Art, Kyoto, Japan, Cincinnati Art Museum and the San Francisco Museum of Modern Art.

References

1938 births
Living people
American women artists
American artists of Japanese descent
Japanese-American internees
20th-century American women
21st-century American women